Trisha Krishnan (born 4 May 1983) is an Indian actress and model, who appears in films of 5 languages, predominantly in Tamil and Telugu. She gained prominence after winning the 1999 Miss Chennai pageant, which marked her entry into the film industry. Trisha is often referred as the "Queen Of South India" for her contributions to the film industries of all of the South Indian languages. She has been ranked among the best actresses of South India by The Times of India.

After appearing in a supporting role in the 1999 Tamil romantic drama Jodi, she had her first lead role in the 2002 film Mounam Pesiyadhe. She rose to fame starring in successful masala films such as Saamy (2003), Ghilli (2004) and Aaru (2005) in Tamil cinema, and Varsham (2004), Nuvvostanante Nenoddantana (2005), Athadu (2005) and Aadavari Matalaku Ardhalu Verule (2007) in Telugu cinema, winning three Filmfare Awards for Best Actress – Telugu for Varsham, Nuvvostanante Nenoddantana and Aadavari Matalaku Ardhalu Verule. Trisha made her Bollywood debut in the satirical comedy Khatta Meetha (2010). Her performances in the comedy drama Abhiyum Naanum (2008), the romantic drama Vinnaithaandi Varuvaayaa (2010), the political thriller Kodi (2016), the romantic drama '96 (2018), and the epic historical drama Ponniyin Selvan: I (2022) were met with high critical acclaim; Kodi and '96 earned her the Filmfare Award for Best Actress (Critics) – Tamil and the Filmfare Award for Best Actress – Tamil respectively.

Early life
Trisha was born on 4 May 1983 to Krishnan Iyer and Uma in Chennai (then known as Madras) into a Palakkad Tamil Brahmin family. She completed schooling at the Sacred Heart Matriculation School in Church Park, Chennai, and later pursued a Bachelor of Business Administration (BBA) course at the Ethiraj College for Women (Chennai). She ventured into modelling and appeared in several print and television commercials. In 1999, she won the "Miss Salem" beauty pageant, and later the same year, the Miss Chennai contest. She had also won the Miss India 2001 pageant's "Beautiful Smile" award. She follows a vegetarian diet.

Trisha had aspired to become a criminal psychologist initially, and resisted the thought of pursuing acting, as she wanted to complete her studies first. She also appeared in Falguni Pathak's music video Meri Chunar Udd Udd Jaye as Ayesha Takia's friend, which was directed by Radhika Rao and Vinay Sapru. She was later approached for an acting role in the Tamil film Lesa Lesa (2003) by Indian film director Priyadarshan, which marked the beginning of her professional career as an actress. She followed a tight shooting schedule while in college, making it difficult for her to continue her education. However, she compensated by attending summer classes.

Film career

1999–2003: Early career and success 
Soon after her pageant success, Trisha began her acting career in a minor supporting role as Simran's friend in the romantic drama Jodi (1999). The first film she accepted was the Priyadarshan-directed Lesa Lesa, with the promotional posters for the film, also creating an offer to star in the A. R. Rahman musical hit, Enakku 20 Unakku 18 (2003). However, both the projects' releases were severely delayed, and her first release was Ameer's Mounam Pesiyadhe (2002) opposite Surya Sivakumar. The film became a moderate success at the box office and managed to gain credentials for Trisha, with critics claiming that she was "undoubtedly a refreshing new find, with sparkling eyes and appealing demeanour", also going onto praise the dubbing artiste, Savitha Reddy, who has since regularly dubbed for Trisha. Manasellam (2003), her second project, saw her play a cancer patient; but the film went unnoticed.

Her subsequent release was the Hari-directed action film, Saamy with Vikram. She played a soft-spoken college-going Brahmin girl and received positive reviews for her performance, with Sify's reviewer citing that she was "appealingly sensual" and looked "glamorous", and another critic writing that she looked "very pretty" and suited the role. The masala flick became the biggest blockbuster of the year, grossing  16 crores, and landed Trisha new offers, including several high-budget productions. Lesa Lesa, which was supposed to be her début, released next. The romantic musical, based on the 1998 Malayalam film Summer in Bethlehem, fetched generally positive reviews. Following Lesa Lesa, she appeared in Alai which proved unsuccessful at the box office. Then released her Enakku 20 Unakku 18 (2003) which was commercially unsuccessful, but was critically acclaimed because of its music and visuals which helped propel her career.

2004–2008: Stardom in Telugu and Tamil cinema
In 2004, she débuted in Telugu cinema with M S Raju's romantic action film Varsham, which turned her into an overnight sensation. Critics lauded her performance as Sailaja, a middle-class girl who becomes a film star on her father's insistence; Jeevi from Idlebrain claimed that she was "beautiful" and a "big plus to the film", labelling her performance as "natural", while Sify noted that she had "transformed herself into a fine actress with immense screen presence". A critic from fullhyderabad.com praised her, citing that she had shown why Tamil Nadu was "busy building her a temple", further adding that she looked "so fresh and fine, you feel like gifting her to the roses". While the film was a major commercial success, running for over 175 days theatres, being declared a "sensational hit" and becoming one of the highest-grossers of the year, Trisha won her first Filmfare Awards for Best Actress – Telugu, as well as the Santosham Award for Best Actress. She was also offered the same role in its Tamil remake Mazhai, which she however declined. Later that year, she enacted the female lead opposite Vijay in the action comedy film Ghilli. She played the character of Dhanalakshmi, a helpless girl, whom a Kabaddi player tries to save from the clutches of an influential thug, who wants to marry her, with most critics agreeing that her performance was overshadowed by Vijay, and Prakash Raj's in particular. The film eventually emerged the highest-grossing Tamil film of the year, celebrating a 175-days-run, too, and remains Trisha's biggest commercial success at the time. She next appeared in a small role in Mani Ratnam's political drama Aayutha Ezhuthu, starring as part of an ensemble cast that included Siddharth, Madhavan and Surya. The film, despite favourable reviews, performed poorly at the box office, while she was again outshone by the three lead male actors.

In the following two years, Trisha had 12 releases overall, which all but one featured her as the female lead. She was part of two male-oriented action-masala flicks Thirupaachi and Aaru, directed by Perarasu and Hari, which both offered only limited roles for her, with the former becoming a major commercial success. In her second Telugu project, the romantic drama Nuvvostanante Nenoddantana, she starred alongside Siddharth. The film, being Prabhu Deva's directorial début, opened to rave reviews, with Trisha receiving praise for her portrayal as the village girl Siri, which earned her several Best Actress awards, including her second consecutive Filmfare Awards for Best Actress – Telugu and her first Nandi Award for Best Actress. Idlebrain noted that she was "just great. Her tender looks, innocent face and Telugu traditional costumes make her a treat to watch", further labelling her expressions and "naughty antics" as excellent, while Sify wrote of Trisha that she was "amazing as Siri [...] It is her career-best performance and she has excelled throughout." The film eventually won eight Filmfare Awards South, the most ever by any Telugu film, while also emerging as a major commercial success at the box office. She then starred alongside Mahesh Babu in the action thriller Athadu, which proved to be a critical and commercial success, and her performance earned her third nomination for the Filmfare Award for Best Actress – Telugu. Trisha later went on to reprise the role in its Tamil remake as well. Her subsequent releases, N Lingusamy's Ji and Aathi, which saw her pairing with Ajith Kumar and Vijay, respectively, were both critical and economical failures, while Aaru was a moderate success. The successes of Varsham and Nuvvostanante Nenoddantana led to Trisha being cast in the third consecutive M. S. Raju film, with the producer stating that she was "one of the most talented and beautiful actresses I have ever worked with", going on to draw comparisons to the works of Savitri, Nargis and Sophia Loren. The film, Pournami, directed by Prabhu Deva again, featured her in the titular role alongside an ensemble cast and bombed at the box office. Her sole Tamil release of 2006, Unakkum Enakkum, the remake of Nuvvostanante Nenoddantana, where she acted opposite Jayam Ravi, did well at the box office. She starred in the Telugu film Stalin with Chiranjeevi, following which her Telugu film Sainikudu with Mahesh Babu was released.

Her next release was Aadavari Matalaku Ardhalu Verule where she was cast opposite Venkatesh. The film, Selvaraghavan's first Telugu venture, was a family entertainer and received positive reviews from critics. Trisha received her third Filmfare Award for Best Actress – Telugu for her performance in the film. She next starred in Kireedam alongside Ajith Kumar, where Trisha was stated as playing “her usual role and [not] bringing anything special to the table”. Her 2008 Tamil films, Bheema and Kuruvi failed at the box-office. In the Telugu film Krishna with Ravi Teja became a blockbuster. Her other release Bujjigadu starring Prabhas, directed by Puri Jagannadh, had a decent run. Trisha was praised for her performance in Radhamohan's Abhiyum Naanum. King starring Nagarjuna directed by Sreenu Vaitla emerged as a blockbuster at the box office. She received nominations for the Filmfare Award for Best Actress – Telugu, and Tamil for her performances in Krishna and Abhiyum Naanum  respectively.

2009–2017: Further success
Her 2009 films Sarvam with Arya and Sankham opposite Gopichand did not do well and became just average grossers. Trisha had a major role, starring as a Syrian Christian Malayali girl Jessie, in Gautham Vasudev Menon's 2010 Tamil romantic drama Vinnaithaandi Varuvaayaa, which was a major commercial success at the box office. The film centres around the complicated relationship between a Syrian Christian Malayali girl and a Tamil Hindu assistant director, who falls in love with her, only to be met by her indifference and reluctance as they belong to different religions and her strict conservative family will never consent to their marriage. Her performance was acclaimed by critics, earning her the Vijay Award for Favourite Heroine, in addition to her second nomination for the Filmfare Award for Best Actress – Tamil. Pavithra Srinivasan of Rediff commented, "Trisha is a revelation. Shorn of her filmi make-up, she dazzles in Nalini Sriram's simple costumes." Sify remarked, "Trisha looks good and delivers her career-best performance in a knock-out role."

Namo Venkatesa was her sole Telugu release in 2010. In the same year, she starred in Manmadhan Ambu with Kamal Haasan and R. Madhavan and made her début in Bollywood with the Priyadarshan film Khatta Meetha. Upon release, the film received mixed reviews from critics and Box Office India declared it an average performer at the box office. She was part of two commercially successful ventures in 2011, Theenmaar in Telugu and Venkat Prabhu's Mankatha in Tamil. The latter was the highest-grossing Tamil film of the year.

She had two Telugu releases in 2012 – Bodyguard, a remake of the same-titled Malayalam film, which saw her being paired with Daggubati Venkatesh for the third time, and Dammu opposite N. T. Rama Rao Jr. – and two Tamil releases in 2013 – Samar starring Vishal, and the comedy-drama Endrendrum Punnagai starring Jiiva. Her performance in the film earned her third nomination for the Filmfare Award for Best Actress – Tamil. She signed on two "women-centric" bilingual projects featuring female lead casts, titled Rambha Urvasi Menaka and Kannaale Kannan. Although both films were commenced, they were stalled in 2013.

Her releases in 2015 included Yennai Arindhaal opposite Ajith Kumar, Thoongavanam with Kamal Haasan, and Bhooloham with Jayam Ravi in Tamil. She also acted in the horror film Aranmanai 2 (2017).

2018–present: Critical acclaim and continued career 
In 2016, she starred in the political drama Kodi alongside Dhanush, which proved to be a critical and commercial success, earning her Filmfare Award for Best Actress (Critics) – Tamil, in addition to her fourth nomination for the Filmfare Award for Best Actress – Tamil.

In 2018, she acted in the Malayalam film Hey Jude with Nivin Pauly making her Malayalam debut. Following this, she played a leading role in the Tamil romantic drama '96 opposite Vijay Sethupathi and received widespread critical acclaim. Janani K. of India Today hailed her performance as her career-best. She won her first Filmfare Award for Best Actress – Tamil, and other Best Actress awards at the SIIMA Awards, the Edison Awards, the Norway Tamil Film Festival Awards, and the Ananda Vikatan Cinema Awards. 

She then starred in a brief role in Petta (2019), alongside superstar Rajinikanth.

She was next seen in Mani Ratnam's 2022 film Ponniyin Selvan: I, in the role of the Chola princess, Kundavai, which received high critical acclaim for her acting.

Other work and endorsements
An ardent animal lover, Trisha has been the Goodwill Ambassador of PETA. In 2010, Trisha collaborated with People for the Ethical Treatment of Animals (PETA) in issuing a public appeal to domesticate stray dogs rather than craving for pedigreed foreign breeds. She was also the Goodwill Ambassador for the "Angel for Animals" campaign organised by PETA in 2010, encouraging people to adopt homeless dogs. PETA praised Trisha for her work, and sent her an appreciation letter highlighting her animal rescue work and efforts to encourage people to adopt Indian community dogs.

Trisha replaced Rani Mukerji as the brand ambassador of Fanta India. She is the brand ambassador of Scooty Pep+, for which she has replaced Preity Zinta. She is also the brand ambassador for Vivel Di Wills, a product by ITC Limited. In 2011, she replaced Asin in the Fairever fairness cream commercial.

Personal life
Trisha resides in Chennai with her mother and grandmother. Trisha's father died in October 2012. She converses fluently in Tamil, English, Hindi, and French. She follows a vegetarian diet

Her mother Uma Krishnan, had been offered various roles by several Tamil film makers and actors including Kamal Hasaan, but turned them down, as she wanted to concentrate on Trisha's career. She accompanies Trisha on film shoots, events, and functions, and they have appeared together only in a commercial advertisement. About her relationship with her mother, Trisha remarks, "She has been the pillar of my strength and has stood by me like a rock through thick and thin.[...] Everyone in the industry and my friends know how close I'm to my mom."

On 23 January 2015, Trisha became engaged to Varun Manian, a Chennai-based businessman. In May 2015, she confirmed that the couple had ended their engagement.

References

External links

 
 
 
 

1983 births
Living people
Actresses in Tamil cinema
Indian beauty pageant winners
Female models from Chennai
Actresses in Telugu cinema
Actresses in Hindi cinema
Filmfare Awards South winners
Nandi Award winners
Ethiraj College for Women alumni
Recipients of the Kalaimamani Award
Indian film actresses
21st-century Indian actresses
Tamil Nadu State Film Awards winners
CineMAA Awards winners
Actresses from Chennai
Tamil actresses
University of Madras alumni
Actresses in Malayalam cinema